Máximo González was the defending champion but decided not to participate.
Paul Capdeville won the title, defeating Antonio Veić 6–3, 6–7(5–7), 6–3 in the final.

Seeds

Draw

Finals

Top half

Bottom half

References
 Main Draw
 Qualifying Draw

Cachantun Cup - Singles
2012 - Singles